Twentysixmiles aka Catalina Island is a 2010 American TV Series.

Jack Kincaid John Schneider (“Dukes of Hazzard”) had life figured out. With a wife, two kids, and a successful career at an investment firm, Jack was living the life most men dream about… While Jack was a winner in the boardroom, he could not figure out how to balance a successful career with a successful marriage. Ultimately, Jack’s wife Keri Jessica Tuck  filed for a divorce. Keri decides to raise their children, 15 year-old Walt and 11 year-old Emma in a calmer, more idyllic lifestyle – on the picturesque island of Catalina, 26 miles off the coast of Southern California, where her brother lives.  Aided by Sean Murphy Jack’s former best friend, former brother-in-law, and former band member he rediscovering life as a father, and even catches the eye of beautiful local, Jennifer (Tessie Santiago, TV’s “Good Morning, Miami” and “Queen of Swords”). When Sean proposes the ultimate idea – that he and Jack reunite their college band ‘The Renegades’ – Jack soon finds that his dreams never did die, they just went on hiatus.

Cast 
 John Schneider - Jack Kincaid
 Eric Lange - Sean 'Murph' Murphy
 Angela Oh - Charlene
 Jordan Garrett - Walt Kincaid
 Spencer Locke - Sally Burnish
 Jessica Tuck - Keri Kincaid
 Tessie Santiago - Jennifer Calderon
 Aris Alvarado - Manny
 Hannah Leigh - Emma Kincaid
 Kelly Finley - Amanda Burnish
 Daniel Quinn - Dirk Stillwell
 John Billingsley - Dennis
 Candice Afia - Lindsay
 Bonita Friedericy - Sister Consuela
 Kimberly Caldwell - Taylor

References

External links 

2010s American drama television series
English-language television shows